El Comercio is a daily Ecuadorian newspaper in Quito. It covers news from inside and outside the country, although its focus is primarily on the former, especially on Quito, Guayaquil and occasionally Cuenca. It competes against El Universo for the largest print distribution in Ecuador.

The paper was founded on January 1, 1906 in Quito, Ecuador by Celiano Monge and brothers César Mantilla Jácome and Carlos Mantilla Jácome. The newspaper remained in the Mantilla family until January 12, 2015 when the newspaper was sold to Telglovisión S.A., company property of the entrepreneur Remigio Ángel González. Currently the Director of the newspaper is Marcos Vaca Morales.

The main sections and supplements are Politics, Opinion, Law, Business, Sports, Quito, Ecuador, World, Society, Culture, Family, Education, Blogs, among others.

External links
Official site

Spanish-language newspapers
Newspapers published in Ecuador
Publications established in 1906
Mass media in Quito
1906 establishments in Ecuador